is a Japanese media franchise. It primarily consists of a series of fantasy figures created by Hobby Japan and Megahouse, featuring character designs from multiple artists including Rei Hiroe, Hisasi, Saitom and Tony. A 12-episode anime television series based on the setting aired from July to September 2015. A manga series and a video game have also been announced.

Plot summary
The series consists of a sequence of short stories describing the (mis-) adventures of four female adventurers in a fantasy world teeming with dangerous monsters and hostile magicians. Clad in generously cut-out, yet effective bikini-type armor, the four women must learn to overcome the hazards of their world to meet their living expenses while at the same time trying to get comfortable with the idea of exposing too much of their curvaceous physiques.

Characters

Main characters 

A redhaired, somewhat impulsive and stubborn woman, and the party's leader. She is also the daughter of a legendary warrior who saved the country in the past.

A beautiful blonde woman who (most unbecoming to her vocation) harbors closeted sexual desires.

The youngest and most timid member of the adventure party, the Mage is a petite purple-haired girl skilled in the art of sorcery.

A member of the Dark Elf race who assists the party with a versatile combination of combat and magic-using skills. Initially quite haughty when she first joined, she has shed much of her attitude as the four of them have kept adventuring together.

Other characters

A survivalist with horrible cooking skills who becomes a very close partner of Valkyrie.

A lady of noble birth who has decided to dedicate her life to fighting evil. Valkyrie is very arrogant and tsundere in nature.

A petite-looking priestess of a war deity, whose specialty lies in combat-related magic at the expense of her clerical healing capacities.

A young female ninja who intends to steal all the bikini armor she can find in order to eventually get her hands on the most legendary bikini armor.

A very determined and strong fightress who likes to express herself with otherworldly (i.e., computer game-related) terms. However, despite her grimness, she is deadly afraid of the undead.

A demon-like, childish girl who can awake and control the dead with her magic, and even transform the living coming into contact with her into undead. A necro-fetishist, she wishes to attach herself to another girl, preferably Black Knight, and make them her zombie companion.

Media

Anime
An anime television series based on the manga by studios Feel and PRA aired from July 8 to September 23, 2015. Madman Entertainment secured streaming rights in Australia & New Zealand, who simulcasted the series on AnimeLab. Funimation announced they had secured streaming rights within North America, and simulcasted the series on their service. Following Sony's acquisition of Crunchyroll, the series was moved to Crunchyroll.

Episode list

References

External links
  
  
 

Comedy anime and manga
Crunchyroll anime
Fantasy anime and manga
Feel (animation studio)
Mass media franchises
Parody anime and manga
Tokyo MX original programming